Ivan Fíla, alternate name Ivan Fila, is a Czech film director, screenwriter and producer.

Life and work 

Fíla was born in Prague, Czechoslovakia. He moved to Germany in 1977 where he received a directing and scriptwriting degree at the Film Department of the university in Cologne. Fíla shot documentaries and shorts before making his feature debut with Lea. The feature premiered at the Venice Film Festival in 1996 and won the OCIC-Award. Lea was also nominated for Best Foreign Language Film at the Golden Globes and for best young film at the European Film Awards. At the Brussels International Film Festival, Lea won both the Audience Award and the Crystal Star for Best European Feature. Lea also won the Satyajit Ray Award for best film at the London Film Festival and many others including two Czech Lions. Lea brought Fíla to Hollywood where he was hired by Steven Spielberg to rewrite and direct The Betty Schimmel Story.

Fíla's follow-up King of thieves premiered at the Moscow Filmfestival in 2004. King of Thieves won the Prix d'Or for Best European Screenplay and won four Czech Lions including Best Actor. Other credits include documentaries as Vaclav Havel – A bohemian fairy tale, Hitler's blackmail, Steps in a Labyrinth, Fog, Tales from another world, Joschka Fischer and others. Fíla is currently working on his English language project Bella Luna.

He lives in Frankfurt, Los Angeles and Prague.

Filmography

Feature films 
 1996: Lea
 2004: King of thieves
 2012: Bella Luna (in preparation)

Documentary Films 

 1982: Harley Heaven
 1985: Salty dreams
 1987: Margarete Buber-Neumann - A German destiny
 1988: The Pauls's church
 1989: In the name of the revolution
 1990: Through a labyrinth
 1991: Tales from another world
 1993: Vaclav Havel - A bohemian fairytale
 1994: Fog
 1995: Hitler's blackmail
 2007: Joschka Fischer

Short films (all 1986) 

 Story of hope
 Encounter
 The last witch
 Two brothers
 The black man

Awards 

For Lea

 1996: OCIC Award at the Venice Film Festival
 1996: European Film Awards - Best Young European Film of the Year- nominee
 1997: Satyajit Ray Award at the London Film Festival
 1997: Two Czech Lions and 9 nominees at the Czech Film Awards
 1997: Audience Award, Prix C.I.C.A.E and Prix du Jury etudiant - Best Film, Premiers Plans Festival D´Angers, France
 1997: Opera Prima Award - Best Film, International Film Festival Montevideo, Uruguay
 1997: Audience award at the Brussels Film Festival, Belgium
 1997: Nominee - Best Film at Deutscher Filmpreis, Germany
 1997: Crystal Star at the Brussels Film Festival, Belgium
 1997: Grand Prix VESUVIO AWARD at the Napoli Filmfestival, Italy
 1997: Grand Prix - Best Film at the International Film Festival, Film Forum Bratislava, Slovakia
 1997: FIPRECI-Award - Best Film at the International Film Festival Sotschi, Russia
 1997: Opera Prima Award - Best Feature Film at Puerto Rico International Film Festival
 1998: Golden Globe Awards - Best Foreign Film - nominee
 1998: Best Dramatic Feature at the San Jose Film Festival, USA

For King of Thieves

 2004: Slovakias Oscar nomination for Best Foreign Film
 2004: Four Czech Lions and 10 nominees (including Best Film, Best Direcror and Best Screenplay) at the Czech Film Awards
 2004: "Silver Griphon" - Audience Award for Best Film at the Festival of Festivals St. Petersburg, Russia
 2004: TRILOBIT - Best Director and Best Screenplay, Czech film and TV Association Annual Award
 2005: Audience Award - Best Film - World Cinema at the Phoenix Film Festival
 2005: Best Film - nomination at the Adolf Adolf Grimme Awards, Germany

For Hitler's blackmail

 1995: German TV-Award - Best Film
 1995: Best Film at the Festival international du film d´histoire, France

References

External links 

 
 Ivan Fíla at filmartists.de

Living people
Czech screenwriters
Male screenwriters
German-language film directors
Film directors from Prague
Year of birth missing (living people)